Wakasugi (written: 若杉) is a Japanese surname. Notable people with the surname include:

, Japanese orchestra conductor
, Japanese fencer
, Japanese footballer
, Japanese footballer

Japanese-language surnames